Myrmica rugulosa is a species of ant belonging to the family Formicidae.

It is native to Europe.

References

Myrmica
Taxa named by William Nylander (botanist)
Insects described in 1849